Toh Kian Chui ( 1 October 1927 - 9 November 2000) was a philanthropist and multi-millionaire businessman in the construction industry from Singapore. Chui started one of the first road construction companies in Singapore, named the Swee Constructions in 1948. Swee Constructions paved the first runway for the Singapore Changi Airport in the 1960s. The company was also responsible for the building of the facilities in Kusu Island that was enlarged and transformed from two tiny outcrops on a reef, into an island holiday resort. Mr Toh was a generous contributor to many charities in Singapore, and was awarded both the Public Service Star (Bintang Bakti Masyrakat) and Public Service Medal (Pingbat Bakti Masyarakat) by the government of Singapore.

Toh Kian Chui has a foundation named after him; the Toh Kian Chui foundation, which has donated S$20 million to the Lee Kong Chian School of Medicine (LKCMedicine). With matching funds from the Singapore government, the total endowment for LKCMedicine – a partnership between NTU and Imperial College London – may go up to S$50 million. The gift has gone towards setting up an endowment to fund, in perpetuity, a Distinguished Professorship, a Gold Medal student award, scholarships, research and education. In recognition of the gift, the upcoming three-storey Annex at LKCMedicine's headquarters building at 11 Mandalay Road, Singapore 308232 will be named after Toh Kian Chui.

Personal life
Toh had three children, Toh Keng Hong, Toh Keng Choo, and Toh Keng Siong.

References
 

1927 births
2000 deaths